SS Uniwaleco was a South-African Whale Factory ship that was torpedoed by the German submarine U-161 in the Caribbean Sea  west of the Saint Vincent Passage on 7 March 1942 while she was travelling from Curaçao to Freetown with a stopover in Trinidad while carrying a cargo of 8800 tons of fuel oil.

Construction 
Uniwaleco was built at the Harland & Wolff shipyard in Belfast, United Kingdom in August 1905. Where she was launched and completed that same year. Quadruple expansion steam engine driving two screw propellers. The ship could generate 658 n.h.p. with a speed of 12 knots thanks to her two double boilers, two single boilers and 18 corrugated furnaces.

Sinking 
The damaged ship became uncontrollable and settled in the water while sailing in circles, but she did not sink. The U-boat fired a coup de grâce at Uniwaleco 15 minutes after the first attack and hit her in the aft of the ship which broke her in two and sank her within three minutes. The sinking took the lives of 18 crewmen with the 33 survivors taking to a lifeboat and landing on St. Vincent.

Wreck 

References

1905 ships
Maritime incidents in March 1942
World War II shipwrecks in the Caribbean Sea
Ships sunk by German submarines in World War II
Ships built in Belfast
Ships built by Harland and Wolff
Whaling ships
Merchant ships of South Africa